Willis Merwyn Johnson (May 9, 1923 – July 14, 2019), better known as Merv Johnson, was a Canadian farmer and politician in Saskatchewan.

Johnson was the Co-operative Commonwealth Federation Member for Parliament for Kindersley, Saskatchewan. He first won his seat in the House of Commons of Canada in the 1953 federal election and was re-elected in 1957 before being defeated in the 1958 general election in the Diefenbaker landslide. He attempted to re-enter the House of Commons in several subsequent elections as a New Democrat but was unsuccessful.

In 1977, Johnson was appointed to serve as Saskatchewan's agent-general in London, England. He also served for several years as president of the Saskatchewan CCF-NDP and was president of the federal New Democratic Party of Canada from 1963 to 1965. He died in Victoria, British Columbia in July 2019 at the age of 96.

References

External links

1923 births
2019 deaths
20th-century Canadian politicians
Co-operative Commonwealth Federation MPs
Members of the House of Commons of Canada from Saskatchewan
Presidents of the New Democratic Party of Canada